Flight Lieutenant Vijay Vasant Tambay was an officer of the Indian Air Force whose aircraft was shot down on 5 December 1971 over West Pakistan while on a strike against the Pakistani airbase of Rafiqui, during the 1971 Indo-Pak War. Officially recorded by the Indian Air Force as killed in action, Flt Lt Tambay is believed to have been one of the five pilots reported by Pakistan Observer to have been captured alive on 5 December 1971. However, although a number of reports from eyewitnesses have subsequently suggested that Flt Lt Tambay was indeed captured alive, he was not repatriated at the end of the war, while the Pakistan Government denies having in their possession any Indian Prisoners of War from the 1971 war,. making him one of The missing 54 Indian defence personnel from the war who are believed to be in Pakistani custody.

See also
Damayanti Tambay

References

External links
The Shorkot Road Raid. Bharat-rakshak.com

Indian Air Force officers
Indian aviators
Pilots of the Indo-Pakistani War of 1971
Indian military personnel of the Indo-Pakistani War of 1971
Possibly living people
Indian prisoners of war
Aviators killed by being shot down
Indian military personnel killed in action
1943 births